Magnus Thue (13 February 1980 – 20 February 2022) was a Norwegian politician.

Thue died on 21 February 2022, at the age of 42.

References

1980 births
2022 deaths
21st-century Norwegian politicians
Conservative Party (Norway) politicians
Norwegian state secretaries
Norwegian political scientists
University of Oslo alumni
People from Eidskog